Oremif Island (Остров Оримиф) is an island in the Sakhalin Gulf, at the southern end of the Sea of Okhotsk. It is located in the Amur Liman, about 3 km from the shore.

Geography
Oremif is horseshoe-shaped and it is about 2 km across. 22 km further up the estuary lies Ostrov Vospri.

Administratively Oremif belongs to the Khabarovsk Krai of the Russian Federation.

Oremif Island should not be confused with the settlement called Oremif located on the Amur's estuary shore, about 5 km to the NE of the island.

References

 Location
 Geographic data
 Travel data
 Pollution of the Amur water near Oremif Island
 Russian seabird data

External links
 Khabarovsk Krai

Islands of the Sea of Okhotsk
Islands of the Russian Far East
Islands of Khabarovsk Krai